William Sowode, D.D. was a priest and academic in the first half of the sixteenth century.

Sowood was born in Norfolk. He was educated at Corpus Christi College, Cambridge, graduating B.A. in 1508; MA in 1511; and B.D. in 1523. He became Fellow in 1508; and Master
in 1523.He held livings at Madingley and Landbeach. He died on 29 November 1544.

References 

Alumni of Corpus Christi College, Cambridge
Fellows of Corpus Christi College, Cambridge
Masters of Corpus Christi College, Cambridge
1544 deaths
People from Norfolk